The Ulster Way is a series of walking routes which encircles Northern Ireland. It was founded in the 1970s by Wilfrid Merydith Capper, who was inspired by Tom Stephenson's Pennine Way. The route was relaunched in 2009 by the Department of the Environment (Northern Ireland).

The vast majority of the trail lies within Northern Ireland, with small sections being in the Republic of Ireland. The path visits many places of interest including the Mourne Mountains, Giant's Causeway, Cavehill and the Sperrins. Most of the sections are clearly sign-posted.

History

Wilfrid Capper developed the idea for the Ulster Way in 1946, as a waymarked trail that would pass through the six counties of Northern Ireland, linking 15 youth hostels which were in place at the time. Once implemented, this original route stretched for 665 miles.

Towards the end of the 20th century, large sections of the trail fell into disrepair or were "lost" due to increased car traffic on some of the road sections, and ambiguity of ownership and land access rights.

In April 2003, Environment Minister Angela Smith MP announced a project to improve and maintain the Ulster Way. A new route was agreed in early 2009. The new route was officially opened on 16 September 2009. This revised route is 625 miles; the first people to hike the entire revised route are thought to be schoolboys Matthew Hoper and Simon Harris, who completed it between 28 June and 4 August 2010.

References

Further reading
Several books have been published as a guide to walking the route. Including:
 The Ulster Way, Paddy Dillon, The O'Brien Press, 1999, 
 Walking the Ulster Way, Alan Warner, Appletree Press, 1989, 
 Beyond Belfast: a 560-mile walk across Northern Ireland on sore feet, Will Ferguson, Penguin Group (Canada), 2009, .  A travel memoir / novel with many side stories and pieces of background information.

Footpaths in Northern Ireland
Long-distance footpaths in the United Kingdom
Long-distance trails in the Republic of Ireland